Professor Lino Briguglio is a Professor of Economics, internationally known for his work on islands and small states studies. He currently directs the Islands and Small States Institute  of the University of Malta. Formerly he was director of the University Gozo Campus and for a time also chaired  the Board of Trustees of the Small States Network for Economic Development, which was funded by the World Bank.  He was Head of the Economics Department and of the Banking and Finance Department at the University of Malta, as well at CEO of the Foundation for International Studies, located in Valletta, Malta.

Professor Briguglio was awarded a Ph.D. in Economics from the University of Exeter (UK) in 1982 and an Honours and master's degree in Economics from the University of Malta (1972 and 1977). He obtained a Diploma in Social Studies from the University of Oxford (UK) in 1970.

Professor Briguglio has published a large number of studies on islands and small states, one of which is a seminal article on inherent economic vulnerabilities of small island states in World Development (September 1995). He has also developed written various papers on economic resilience, one of which was published in Oxford Development Studies (Sept 2009). He has also edited a series of four books on Vulnerability, Resilience and Competitiveness of Small States, published by the University of Malta in collaboration with the Commonwealth Secretariat, and two books on small states published by Routledge.

Professor Briguglio was a lead author for the Third, Fourth and Fifth Assessments Reports of the Intergovernmental Panel on Climate Change (IPCC), contributing mainly to the chapters on small islands’ vulnerability and adaptation to climate change. The work of the IPCC, including the contributions of many scientists, was recognised by the joint award of the 2007 Nobel Peace Prize.

In 1999 at a meeting of the United Nations Environment Program's governing council, Briguglio stated that small countries "are vulnerable to forces outside their control."

At a symposium in early 2010 at the University of Malta, Briguglio said that disbelief in climate change is "ideological, difficult to change and often rooted in rightwing sources".

Professor Briguglio has acted as consultant to several international organisations including the UNDESA, UNEP, United Nations Development Program, the United Nations Conference on Trade and Development (UNCTAD), World Bank, the Commonwealth Secretariat, SOPAC and CARICOM on matters related to the economies of small states. He has represented the Maltese government in many international conferences dealing with islands’ and small states’ affairs. He is a member of the Malta Competition and Consumer Affairs Appeals Tribunal.

He was a core member of the Malta EU Steering and Action Committee during the Malta's negotiations for EU membership

References

Living people
Year of birth missing (living people)